Ernest George Bowering (30 March 1891 – 23 November 1961) was a professional footballer who played for Tottenham Hotspur, Fulham and Merthyr Town.

Career 
After playing for the youth side Tottenham Thursday, Bowering joined Tottenham Hotspur where the left half appeared in seven matches in the second half of the 1911–12 season. He went on to sign for Fulham in October 1912, where he played one match before ending his career at Merthyr Town.

Personal life 
Bowering served in the Royal Navy, the Royal Naval Air Service and the Royal Air Force during the First World War. He finished the war with the rank of Corporal Mechanic.

References 

1891 births
1961 deaths
Footballers from Wandsworth
English footballers
English Football League players
Tottenham Hotspur F.C. players
Fulham F.C. players
Merthyr Town F.C. players
Royal Navy personnel of World War I
Royal Naval Air Service personnel of World War I
Royal Air Force personnel of World War I
Association football wing halves
Royal Navy sailors
Royal Air Force airmen